Kings Park is a very small, triangular shaped suburb of Adelaide in the City of Unley surrounded by Goodwood Road (west), Cross Road (south) and the Belair railway line (northeast). 

It is served by two railway stations; Millswood is on the northern boundary of the suburb and Unley Park is adjacent to the southeast corner of the suburb.

References

Suburbs of Adelaide